Çaltıbozkır is a village in Silifke district of Mersin Province, Turkey. It is situated in the forests of the Taurus Mountains. The population of Çaltıbozkır is 1029 as of 2011. The village economy depends on cereal agriculture. Recently in irrigated fields tomato is also produced. But animal breeding is on decline because of government ban on goat breeding (to protect forest)

References

Villages in Silifke District